Narrative transportation theory proposes that when people lose themselves in a story, their attitudes and intentions change to reflect that story. The mental state of narrative transportation can explain the persuasive effect of stories on people, who may experience narrative transportation when certain contextual and personal preconditions are met, as Green and Brock postulate for the transportation-imagery model. As Van Laer, de Ruyter, Visconti, and Wetzels elaborate further, narrative transportation occurs whenever the story receiver experiences a feeling of entering a world evoked by the narrative because of empathy for the story characters and imagination of the story plot.

Defining the field 
Deighton, Romer, and McQueen anticipate the construct of narrative transportation by arguing that a story invites story receivers into the action it portrays and, as a result, makes them lose themselves in the story. Gerrig was the first to coin the notion of narrative transportation within the context of novels. Using travel as a metaphor for reading, he conceptualizes narrative transportation as a state of detachment from the world of origin that the story receiver—in his words, the traveler—experiences because of his or her engrossment in the story, a condition that Green and Brock later describe as the story receiver's experience of being carried away by the story. Notably, the state of narrative transportation makes the world of origin partially inaccessible to the story receiver, thus marking a clear separation in terms of here/there and now/before, or narrative  world/world of origin.

Relevant features
Most research on narrative transportation follows the original definition of the construct. Scholars in the field constantly reaffirm the relevance of three features. 
 Narrative transportation requires that people process stories—the acts of receiving and interpreting.
 Story receivers become transported through two main components: empathy and mental imagery. Empathy implies that story receivers try to understand the experience of a story character, that is, to know and feel the world in the same way. Thus, empathy offers an explanation for the state of detachment from the world of origin that is narrative transportation. In mental imagery, story receivers generate vivid images of the story plot, such that they feel as though they are experiencing the events themselves.
 When transported, story receivers lose track of reality in a physiological sense.

In accordance with these features, Van Laer et al. define narrative transportation as the extent to which 
 an individual empathizes with the story characters and 
 the story plot activates their imagination,
which leads them to experience suspended reality during story reception.

Similar constructs
Narrative transportation is a form of experiential response to narratives and thus is similar to other constructs, such as absorption, narrative involvement, identification, optimal experience or flow, and immersion. Yet several subtle, critical differences exist. Absorption refers to a personality trait or general tendency to be immersed in life experiences; transportation  is an engrossing temporary experience. Flow is a more general construct (i.e., people can experience flow in a variety of activities), whereas transportation specifically entails empathy and mental imagery, which do not occur in flow experiences.  Phillips and McQuarrie demonstrate that immersion is primarily an experiential response to aesthetic and visual elements of images, whereas narrative transportation relies on a story with plot and characters, features that are not present in immersion. Identification emphasizes the involvement with story characters, while narrative transportation is concerned with the involvement with the narrative as a whole.

Narrative persuasion 

Since narrative transportation's conceptualization, research has demonstrated that the transported "traveler" can return changed by the journey. Subsequent studies have confirmed that a story can engross the story receiver in a transformational experience, whose effects are strong and long-lasting. The transformation that narrative transportation achieves is persuasion of the story receiver. More specifically, Van Laer et al.'s literature review reveals that narrative transportation can cause affective and cognitive responses, beliefs, and attitude and intention changes. However, the processing pattern of narrative transportation is markedly different from that in well-established models of persuasion.

A 2016 meta-analysis found significant, positive narrative persuasion (i.e., narrative-consistent) effects for attitudes, beliefs, intentions and behaviors.

Rival models
Before 2000, dual-process models of persuasion, especially the elaboration likelihood model and heuristic-systematic model, dominated persuasion research. These models attempt to explain why people accept or reject message claims. According to these models, the determination of a claim's acceptability can result from careful evaluation of the arguments presented or from reliance on superficial cues, such as the presence of an expert. Whether receivers scrutinize a message depends on the extent to which they are able and motivated to process it systematically. As important variables, these models include empathy, familiarity, involvement, and the number and nature of thoughts the message evokes. If these variables are mainly positive, the receiver's attitudes and intentions tend to be more positive; if the variables are predominantly negative, the resulting attitudes and intentions are more negative. These variables also exist in narrative persuasion.

Differences between analytical and narrative persuasion
Analytical persuasion and narrative persuasion differ depending on the role of involvement. In analytical persuasion, involvement depends on the extent to which the message has personally relevant consequences for a receiver's money, time, or other resources. If these consequences are sufficiently severe, receivers evaluate the arguments carefully and generate thoughts related to the arguments. Yet, as Slater notes, even though severe consequences for stories are relatively rare, "viewers or readers of an entertainment narrative typically appear to be far more engrossed in the message." This type of involvement, or narrative transportation, is arguably the crucial determinant of narrative persuasion.

Though the dual-process models provide a valid description of analytical persuasion, they do not encompass narrative persuasion. Analytical persuasion refers to attitudes and intentions developed from processing messages that are overtly persuasive, such as most lessons in science books, news reports, and speeches. However, narrative persuasion refers to attitudes and intentions developed from processing narrative messages that are not overtly persuasive, such as novels, movies, or video games. Addressing the strength and duration of the persuasive effects of processing stories, narrative transportation is a mental state that produces enduring persuasive effects without careful evaluation of arguments. Transported story receivers are engrossed in a story in a way that neither is inherently critical nor involves great scrutiny.

Sleeper effect
Narrative transportation seems to be more unintentionally affective than intentionally cognitive in nature. This way of processing leads to potentially increasing and long-lasting persuasive effects. Appel and Richter use the term "Sleeper effect" to describe this paradoxical property of narrative transportation over time, which consists of a more pronounced change in attitudes and intentions and a greater certainty that these attitudes and intentions are correct.

Plausible explanations for the sleeper effect are twofold. 
 According to poststructural research, language's articulation in narrative format is capable not only of mirroring reality but also of constructing it. As such, stories could cause profound and durable persuasion of the transported story receiver as a result of his or her progressive internalization. When stories transport story receivers, not only do they present a narrative world but, by reframing the story receiver's language, they also durably change the world to which the story receiver returns after the transportation experience. 
 Research demonstrates that people analyze and retain stories differently from other information formats. For example, Deighton et al. show that analytical advertisements stimulate cognitive responses whereas narrative advertisements are more likely to stimulate affective responses.

Following this line of reasoning, Van Laer et al. define narrative persuasion as
the effect of narrative transportation, which manifests itself in story receivers' affective and cognitive responses, beliefs, attitudes, and intentions from being swept away by a story and transported into a narrative world that modifies their perception of their world of origin.

The conceptual distinction between analytical persuasion and narrative persuasion and the theoretical framework of sound interpretation of narrative persuasion both ground the extended transportation-imagery model (ETIM).

Moderators
ETIM contains three methodological factors that moderate the overall effect of narrative transportation, as van Laer, Feiereisen, and Visconti detail. The narrative transportation effect is stronger
 for stories in the commercial (vs. non-commercial) domain,
 for stories by users (vs. professionals), and
 for stories received alone (vs. with others).

See also 
Media psychology
Narrativity
Storytelling

References 

Consumer behaviour
Narratology
Persuasion